Hüppe or Huppe is a German surname.

List of people with the surname 

 Curtis Huppe (born 1979), Canadian former ice hockey forward
 Hubert Hüppe (born 1956), German politician
 Michael Huppe, American businessman

See also 

 Hoopoe

Surnames
Surnames of German origin
German-language surnames